NGC 3875 is a lenticular galaxy located about 325 million light-years away in the constellation Leo. It was discovered by astronomer  William Herschel on April 27, 1785 and is a member of the Leo Cluster.

See also
 List of NGC objects (3001–4000)

References

External links
 

3875
36675
Leo (constellation)
Leo Cluster
Astronomical objects discovered in 1785
Lenticular galaxies
6739